Paolo Baffi (5 August 1911 – 4 August 1989) was an Italian academic, banker, and economist. He was the Governor of Bank of Italy from 1975 to 1979.

Biography
He was born at Broni. He became governor of the Bank of Italy in 1975, succeeding Guido Carli. His appointment was supported by both the government parties (in particular the Republican Party and Aldo Moro of Christian Democracy, then president) and the main opposition force, the Communist Party.

He resigned in 1979, after a failed accusation against him led by magistrates of the Tribunal of Rome, considered kin to the Caltagirone family (a group of builders who had contracted heavy debts with the Bank of Italy) and Christian Democracy. Baffi died in Rome in 1989.

In March 1979, he was implicated in a judicial investigation into the lack of vigilance by the credit institutes opened by the deputy prosecutor of the Republic of Rome Luciano Infelisi and conducted by the investigating judge Antonio Alibrandi.

Honour 
 : Knight Grand Cross of the Order of Merit of the Italian Republic (2 june 1965)

Bibliography 
 
 
  Soveria Mannelli, Rubbettino, 2011, .
  Soveria Mannelli, Rubbettino, 2011, .

References 

1911 births
1989 deaths
People from Broni
20th-century Italian economists
Italian bankers
Governors of the Bank of Italy
Knights Grand Cross of the Order of Merit of the Italian Republic